UNICOM Global is an American multinational technology corporation headquartered in Mission Hills, California. The company was founded by Corry Hong in Los Angeles, California in 1981 to develop AUTOMON/CICS and related products for the CICS mainframe marketplace. UNICOM Global has grown since then by acquiring publicly-traded and private IT organizations and products, and through property acquisition. Corry Hong was born in Seoul, South Korea and immigrated to the United States at age 20, studying computer science at Pierce College in Los Angeles. He is the CEO and president of the company.

UNICOM Global operates across industry sectors including aerospace and defense, banking, chemical industries, consumer electronics, energy and utilities, healthcare, Fintech, insurance, manufacturing, media and entertainment, oil and gas, retail, telecom, transportation, and Federal, State, and Local Governments.

Corporate structure

UNICOM Global consists of the following major divisions:

 UNICOM Government, Inc. (UGI) -- a provider of information technology products and professional services to Federal, State, and Local Governments. In 2015, Unicom Government was one of 6 vendors jointly awarded a $652 million U.S. Army contract for enterprise IT modernization. UNICOM Government is the former NASDAQ-listed GTSI, whom UNICOM Global acquired in June 2012 (see History section, below).
 UNICOM Engineering – its division that designs and builds purpose-built application platforms and appliances, and provides deployment services for software developers and OEMs. UNICOM Engineering is the former NASDAQ-listed Network Engines Inc, more commonly known as NEI Corporation, which UNICOM Global acquired in September 2012 (see History section, below). 
 US Robotics – its division that focuses on Artificial Intelligence (AI), Machine Learning, and Robotics. US Robotics has origins as a pioneer in internet networking capabilities.
 Firetide – its division that designs and sells software and hardware focusing on Wireless Mesh network technology.
 Memeo – its division that builds products for File Sharing, Big Data, and Data Warehousing.
UNICOM Systems – its software division focused on digital transformation products and services. This division includes a number of software products that UNICOM acquired from IBM: System Architect, Focal Point, PurifyPlus, SPSS Survey (now UNICOM Intelligence), solidDB, Cognos Finance (now UNICOM Finance), and the PowerHouse programming language.
 Macro 4 – its division that manages international operations and builds software for enterprise information management, customer communication management (CCM), and mainframe modernization. Macro 4 also builds the Universal Gateway (uniGW) product. Macro 4 was a publicly-traded company that UNICOM Global acquired in 2009 (see history section below). The Macro 4 division includes:
 SoftLanding  Systems – This division develops IBM i software and systems management products. UNICOM Global acquired SoftLanding Systems in 2006, which was one of the "Big Three" change management vendors on the IBM i platform.
 iET Solutions—which builds ITIL-Aligned IT Service Management (ITSM) and Software Asset Management (SAM) products.
 DETEC—which develops and markets software for intercorporate communication as well as for B2B and B2C communication.
 Eden—its capital, mergers and acquisitions, financial services, and real estate division.

Headquarters and Operations

UNICOM Global operates at 31 locations in 17 countries. It owns and operates the following IT Corporate Parks, Innovation Centers, and IT Villages:
 UNICOM Plaza – UNICOM Global Corporate Headquarters in Mission Hills, California.
 UNICOM Technology Park (UTP) – the former Washington Technology Park that UNICOM acquired in 2015, which is now a research and innovation center, as well as UNICOM Government's corporate headquarters.
 UNICOM Science & Technology Park (USTP) – the former Merck Headquarters Building that UNICOM acquired in 2018, which is now a research and innovation center.
 UNICOM Innovation Park -- formerly The Martingale, an 11-story class A office park in Schaumburg, Illinois, purchased by UNICOM in January, 2023,  and now being established as a research & innovation center.
 Pickfair Executive Meeting Center – the former Pickfair Estate in Beverly Hills built by Douglas Fairbanks and Mary Pickford, which is now an executive conference center.
 Roripaugh Ranch – an 800-acre planned community located in California between Los Angeles and San Diego, that is being established as a UNICOM IT Village.
 The Orangery, Crabbet Park IT Center in the southern suburbs of London, UK.

Corporate history
UNICOM Global was founded by Corry Hong in Los Angeles, California in 1981 to develop AUTOMON/CICS and related products for the CICS mainframe marketplace.  Corry Hong was born in Seol, South Korea and immigrated to the United States at age 20, studying computer science at Pierce College in Los Angeles.

In April 1985, UNICOM Global introduced AUTOMON/CICS, an automated action tool for the CICS MVS environment. UNICOM Global achieved success with the AUTOMON product: in April 1988, AUTOMON/CICS was selected to assure systems availability and productivity at the Games for the XXIV Olympiad held in 1988 in Seoul, South Korea. In April 1994, AUTOMON/CICS was nominated for the ICP Million Dollar award.

UNICOM Global grew through the following acquisitions:

See also
Pickfair estate in Beverly Hills, California, owned by UNICOM
Merck Headquarters Building, owned by UNICOM

References 

Software companies based in California
Software companies of the United States
American companies established in 1981
Software companies established in 1981
1981 establishments in California